Melaleuca keigheryi is a shrub in the myrtle family, Myrtaceae with white, papery bark and is endemic to the west coast of Western Australia. In spring, it has heads of pink flowers which fade in color to become white.

Description 
They are also unusual for the genus in that they have pinnate rather than longitudinal veins.

The flowers are a shade of pink to purple and fade to white. They are arranged in heads on the ends of branches which continue to grow after flowering and sometimes also in the upper leaf axils. There are five bundles of stamens around the flower, each with 6 to 10 stamens.

Taxonomy and naming
Melaleuca keigheryi was first formally described in 1999 by Lyndley Craven in Australian Systematic Botany from a specimen collected near Shark Bay. The specific epithet (keigheryi) honours Greg Keighery, an Australian botanist.

Distribution and habitat
Melaleuca keigheryi occurs in the Shark Bay district in the Carnarvon and Yalgoo biogeographic regions where it grows in sand and clay on flats and near roads.

Conservation status
Melaleuca keigheryi is listed as "not threatened" by the Government of Western Australia Department of Parks and Wildlife.

References

keigheryi
Plants described in 1999
Endemic flora of Western Australia
Taxa named by Lyndley Craven